Filippo Arturo Nesci (born January 22, 1993) is an Italian multimedia artist and producer. Nesci was born in Rome, graduated with honors from the Art Center College of Design of Pasadena, California, and currently lives in Los Angeles. He contributed to the invention of Multimedia Psychotherapy by his father Domenico A. Nesci, a psychoanalyst in Rome and Toronto.

Nesci was producer of the following short films: Martha (director: Sam Benenati, score: James Vincent McMorrow), Snippets of Wally Watkins (director: Kevin Lin, 2014), Lineman (director: Eugene Weiss, 2013), Wrecks & Violins (director: Kevin Lin, 2012), The Carnival is on Fire (director: Ryan McDonald, 2012). He also produced music videos for the songs 80’s Fitness (KOAN Sound) and Monster (Meg Myers) as well as several commercials.

References 

Living people
American film producers
American television producers
Italian expatriates in the United States
Photographers from Rome
21st-century Italian painters
Italian male painters
1993 births
Painters from Rome
21st-century Italian male artists